Crocus scardicus  is a species of flowering plant in the genus Crocus of the family Iridaceae. It is a cormous perennial native to eastern Albania (Korab Mountains), Kosovo, North Macedonia.

Found growing from 1700 to 2500 meters, flowering occurs in May to July and it is often found blooming near patches of snow.

References

scardicus